CFRI-FM is a Canadian radio station broadcasting at 104.7 FM in Grande Prairie, Alberta owned by Vista Radio. The station broadcasts a CHR/Top 40 format using its on-air brand name 104.7 2Day FM.

History 
The station began broadcasting on March 30, 2007 with a classic rock format branded as 104.7 Free FM. In July 2014, the station switched to its current format branded as 104.7 2Day FM.

References

External links
 
 

FRI
FRI
Radio stations established in 2007
2007 establishments in Alberta